Aleksa Novaković (born 30 August 1996) is a Serbian professional basketball player for Borac Čačak of the Basketball League of Serbia and the ABA League. He played college basketball for the Eastern Illinois Panthers.

High school and college career 
Novaković moved to U.S. to play high school basketball at Findlay Prep in Henderson, Nevada.

As a college basketball player, Novaković played his freshman year with the Eastern Illinois Panthers. He appeared in 8 games (all off the bench) in their 2015–16 season, averaging 0.6 points, 0.9 rebounds, and 0.5 assists per game. He left the Panthers after his freshman year.

Professional career 
After his college basketball career, Novaković played for Italian teams We're Basket Ortona and Nuovo Basket Aquilano in the 2016–17 season. Novaković played for Mladost Zemun and Novi Pazar of the Serbian League before joining Borac Čačak in 2020. On 25 June 2022, he signed a two-year contract extension with Borac Čačak.

National team career 
In June 2022, Serbia national team head coach Svetislav Pešić added Novaković to the 20-man roster for the third window games at the 2023 FIBA Basketball World Cup qualification.

References

External links 
 Eastern Illinois Panthers Biography
 Player Profile at ABA League
 Player Profile at eurobasket.com
 Player Profile at realgm.com
 Statistics at proballers.com
 Statistics at basketball-reference.com

1996 births
Living people
ABA League players
Basketball players from Belgrade
Basketball League of Serbia players
Eastern Illinois Panthers men's basketball players
Findlay Prep alumni
KK Borac Čačak players
KK Mladost Zemun players
OKK Novi Pazar players
Serbian expatriate basketball people in Italy
Serbian expatriate basketball people in the United States
Serbian men's basketball players
Small forwards